Live at Gotham is a standup comedy television show airing on Comedy Central  in the United States. The show features up and coming stand up comedians performing live at the Gotham Comedy Club in New York City. It premiered on July 21, 2006.

Episodes

Season 1 (2006)

Season 2 (2007)

Season 3 (2008)

Season 4 (2009)

References

External links
 

Comedy Central original programming
2000s American stand-up comedy television series
2006 American television series debuts
2009 American television series endings